{{DISPLAYTITLE:D-arabinose 1-dehydrogenase (NAD(P)+)}}

In enzymology, a D-arabinose 1-dehydrogenase [NAD(P)+] is an enzyme that catalyzes the chemical reaction

D-arabinose + NAD(P)+  D-arabinono-1,4-lactone + NAD(P)H + H+

The 3 substrates of this enzyme are D-arabinose, NAD+, and NADP+, whereas its 4 products are D-arabinono-1,4-lactone, NADH, NADPH, and H+.

This enzyme belongs to the family of oxidoreductases, specifically those acting on the CH-OH group of donor with NAD+ or NADP+ as acceptor. The systematic name of this enzyme class is D-arabinose:NAD(P)+ 1-oxidoreductase. This enzyme is also called D-arabinose 1-dehydrogenase [NAD(P)+].

Structural studies

As of late 2007, only one structure has been solved for this class of enzymes, with the PDB accession code .

References

 
 
 

EC 1.1.1
NADPH-dependent enzymes
NADH-dependent enzymes
Enzymes of known structure